Ai Yunan (born 21 June 1991) is a Chinese weightlifter. He won the silver medal at the 2014 Asian Games in the +105 kg category.

References

1991 births
Living people
Place of birth missing (living people)
Chinese male weightlifters
Asian Games medalists in weightlifting
Weightlifters at the 2014 Asian Games
Asian Games silver medalists for China
Medalists at the 2014 Asian Games
21st-century Chinese people